Herbert Archibald Brown (fl. 1928–1932) was an English footballer who made 139 appearances in the Football League playing for Darlington in the 1920s and 1930s. He also played non-league football for Shildon and Spennymoor United. Brown, a left back, partnered Hughie Dickson at full back in the later part of Dickson's career.

References

Year of birth missing
Year of death missing
Footballers from County Durham
English footballers
Association football fullbacks
Shildon A.F.C. players
Darlington F.C. players
Spennymoor United F.C. players
English Football League players
Place of death missing